Nguyễn Tăng Tuấn (born 28 June 1986) is a Vietnamese footballer who plays as a forward for XSKT Cần Thơ.

References 

1986 births
Living people
People from Thanh Hóa province
Vietnamese footballers
Association football forwards
V.League 1 players
Thanh Hóa FC players
Becamex Binh Duong FC players
Hoang Anh Gia Lai FC players